is a 1989 arcade video game developed by Taito. It is the direct sequel to the 1987 Darius.

Gameplay
The game is set in the inner half of the Solar System, and has the same branching level structure as Darius. Similar to the first Darius game, Darius II was programmed for multiple screens; while a three-screen version like the original exists, Darius II is more commonly and generally represented as a two-screen game.

The red/green/blue powerups from the first game return, and have the same function: respectively, upgrades to the "missile" main weapon and "bomb" subweapon, and a shield to absorb some damage. Two new power-ups were added: a yellow powerup that adds a new "laser" main weapon that functions somewhat similarly to the bombs, and a rainbow powerup that grants one upgrade to all the players weapons. Acquiring these power-ups and the upgrade path is completely different from Darius: a formation of a specific enemy must be completely destroyed (and a given formation may not have a powerup), and every single powerup now grants some kind of upgrade. Further, the various weapons upgrade differently, though the shield upgrade the same as before.

Another new feature in Darius II is the appearance of minibosses known as "captains"; large enemies that appear somewhere in the level before the main boss. In Darius II, these are all smaller versions of bosses from the first game, with similar abilities.

Plot
Darius II takes place sometime after the first Darius game. The colonized planet Darius is recuperating from its invasion from the alien Belser Army thanks to that game's heroes Proco and Tiat. Darius' inhabitants have since situated themselves on the planet Olga while Darius' societies, architecture and attacked areas were being repaired. The space flight Headquarters established on Olga picks up an SOS signal coming from Earth, where the first colonists originated before colonizing Darius. The signal included the description of alien ships similar to those of the Belser Army. Suspecting that these might be their remaining Earthling ancestors, the people of Darius sends both Proco Jr. and Tiat Young to help them.

Ports
A Mega Drive conversion was released in Japan in 1990; it was later released for the Genesis in the United States and Brazil in 1991, where it was renamed Sagaia. Changes include a boss rush mode (via a code) and various modifications to levels and mechanics, such as the boss Steel Spine being moved to another level and the boss Killer Higia being replaced with a similar creation called Nehonojia. This conversion does not support two players, so the ability to choose between Proco Jr. and Tiat Young was added; Proco plays like normal, while Tiat starts every life off with one power level to every weapon.

A Master System conversion, developed by Natsume, was released in Europe and Brazil in 1992, also titled Sagaia. It is somewhat based on the Mega Drive port, and while Tiat Young and her abilities are still present (though even more limited), many zones (and thus bosses) have been completely removed.

The Super CD-ROM² version features an entirely new set of bosses, major changes to levels, and a fully arranged soundtrack including new songs.

In 1996, a port of the arcade version itself was released in Japan and Europe for the Sega Saturn, complete with two-player mode and stretchable wide screen modes. The arcade version is also available in the Japan-only Taito Memories series of emulation-based compilations.

Reception

In Japan, Game Machine listed Darius II on their November 15, 1989, issue as being the sixth most-successful upright/cockpit arcade unit of the month.

Notes

References

External links

Sagaia at MobyGames

1989 video games
1993 video games
Arcade video games
Darius (series)
Sega Genesis games
Game Boy games
Master System games
Multiplayer and single-player video games
TurboGrafx-CD games
Sega Saturn games
Video game sequels
Video games featuring female protagonists
Video games scored by Hisayoshi Ogura
Virtual Console games
Horizontally scrolling shooters
Taito arcade games
Video games developed in Japan